Northumberland County Airport is a small general aviation non-towered airport located in Paxinos, Pennsylvania. It is centrally located between Shamokin and Elysburg. The airport has one asphalt runway (8/26) which is 3297 x 75 ft. / 1005 x 23 m. As of late 2016 there are 23 aircraft based on the field of them 21 are single engine, one being multi engine fixed wing and 1 helicopter aircraft.

The airport is a public use facility and is owned and maintained by the Northumberland County Airport Authority. Aircraft operations average 63 per day with approximately 22,000 a year. 65% local general aviation, 35% transient general aviation and <1% military.

See also
 List of airports in Pennsylvania

References

External links
 Official website
 N79 at Facebook.com
 N79 at AirNav.com
 N79 at Globalair.com

Airports in Pennsylvania
County airports in Pennsylvania
Transportation buildings and structures in Northumberland County, Pennsylvania